Benedict, son of Samud (died after 1233) was a Hungarian noble, who served as Judge royal between 1231 and 1232, during the reign of Andrew II of Hungary.

Based on his father's first name, it is possible that Benedict belonged to the Tomaj clan of Pecheneg origin. He was first mentioned as ispán of Szolnok County in 1217. Two years later, in 1219, he was appointed head of Nyitra County. He governed Újvár County in 1220. Following his replacement from the position of Judge royal, he was present among the king's companion in the forests of Bereg on 20 August 1233, where Andrew II vowed that he would not employ Jews and Muslims to administrate royal revenues, and would pay 10,000 marks as compensation for usurped Church revenues.

References

Sources

 
 

13th-century Hungarian people
Judges royal